Rhinoclemmys panamaensis is an extinct species of turtle belonging to the genus Rhinoclemmys of the family Geoemydidae known from the early to middle Miocene (Hemingfordian) Cucaracha Formation of the Panama Basin of central Panama.

Paleoecology 
In 2010, the holotype specimen was recovered from the Cucaracha Formation located at the western side of the Centenario Bridge in the Panama Canal Zone. The same formation has provided fossils of the crocodylian Centenariosuchus, and the artiodactyl Paratoceras.

References

Bibliography 
 
 
 
 

†panamaensis
Miocene species first appearances
Miocene species extinctions
Burdigalian life
Hemingfordian
Neogene Panama
Fossils of Panama
Panama Canal Zone
Fossil taxa described in 2012
Extinct turtles